The Miss Maryland World competition is a beauty pageant that selects the representative for Maryland in the Miss World America pageant.

The current Miss Maryland World is Carissa Wu.

Winners 
Color key

Notes to table

References

External links

Maryland culture
Women in Maryland